The 1993 World Table Tennis Championships – Corbillon Cup (women's team) was the 35th edition of the women's team championship.

China won the gold medal defeating North Korea in the final 3–0. South Korea won the bronze medal.

Medalists

Final stage knockout phase

Quarter finals

Semifinals

Third-place playoff

Final

See also
List of World Table Tennis Championships medalists

References

-
1993 in women's table tennis